is a former Japanese football player and manager. he is the currently manager of J2 League club Ventforet Kofu.

Club career
Shinoda was born in Kofu on June 18, 1971. After graduating from high school, he joined Japan Soccer League club Kofu SC in 1990. Although stayed there for the whole season, he only played one match. In 1991, he entered Chuo University. After graduating from Chuo University, he joined Japan Football League club Fukuoka Blux (later Avispa Fukuoka) in 1995. The club won the championship in 1995 and was then, promoted to the J1 League from 1996. He played many matches there as a defensive midfielder for a long time. On 2001, as the club finished on 15th place at the league, the club was relegated to J2 League from 2002. He retired at the end of 2004 season, with Fukuoka still being on the J2.

Managerial career
After retirement, Shinoda started his coaching career at Avispa Fukuoka, on 2005. He coached both the top team and its youth team. In July 2008, Shinoda received his opportunity to become the top-team manager, following the dismissal of former coach Pierre Littbarski. The club finished as 3rd place in the 2010 J2 League, earning promotion to the J1 League. However, on 2011, due to underperforming matches and a poor run of results, he was sacked in August. In 2012, he was signed by FC Tokyo as an assistant coach. In July 2016, manager Hiroshi Jofuku was sacked, giving Shinoda another managerial opportunity. However, he was sacked on September 2017. In 2018, he signed with Shimizu S-Pulse, and became an assistant coach of Jan Jönsson. In May 2019, Jönsson was sacked, and Shinoda became the club's manager, being it the third time he was promoted from his assistant coach role since 2005. In 30 November 2022, Shinoda was signed by Ventforet Kofu, who sacked former manager Yoshida. Despite winning an unexpected Emperor's Cup title for them, he was sacked right after it, as underperformances in the J2 League saw the club finish on 18th place out of the 22 participating teams. He will start to manage the club from the 2023 season, returning to Kofu after 31 years, since leaving it in his playing career on 1991.

Club statistics

Managerial statistics

References

External links
 
 

1971 births
Living people
Chuo University alumni
Association football people from Yamanashi Prefecture
Japanese footballers
Japan Soccer League players
J1 League players
J2 League players
Japan Football League (1992–1998) players
Ventforet Kofu players
Avispa Fukuoka players
Japanese football managers
J1 League managers
J2 League managers
Avispa Fukuoka managers
FC Tokyo managers
Shimizu S-Pulse managers
Ventforet Kofu managers
Association football midfielders